The 1952 Wisconsin Badgers football team represented the University of Wisconsin in the 1952 Big Ten Conference football season. Led by fourth-year head coach Ivy Williamson, the Badgers compiled an overall record of 6–3–1 with a mark of 4–1–1 in conference play, sharing the Big Ten title with Purdue. Wisconsin was invited to the Rose Bowl, where they lost to USC. It was the Badgers' first bowl game. Dave Suminski was the team's MVP and George O'Brien was team's captain.

The Badgers offense scored 228 points while the defense allowed 150 points. Wisconsin spent one week at No. 1 in the AP Poll for the first and only time in program history.

Schedule

Wisconsin players in the NFL Draft

References

Wisconsin
Wisconsin Badgers football seasons
Big Ten Conference football champion seasons
Wisconsin Badgers football